Ujae Airport is a public use airstrip at Ujae on Ujae Atoll, Marshall Islands.

Airlines and destinations

References 

Airports in the Marshall Islands